Klara Maučec (born 12 December 1977) is a Slovenian sailor. She competed at three Olympics in 2000, 2004 and 2008. Her best result was at the 2004 Summer Olympics where she finished fourth.

References

External links
 

1977 births
Living people
Slovenian female sailors (sport)
Olympic sailors of Slovenia
Sailors at the 2000 Summer Olympics – 470
Sailors at the 2004 Summer Olympics – 470
Sailors at the 2008 Summer Olympics – 470
21st-century Slovenian women